Javarris Jamiel Williams (born April 8, 1986) is a former American football running back. He was selected by the Kansas City Chiefs in the seventh round of the 2009 NFL Draft. He played college football at Tennessee State University. 

He was also a member of the Seattle Seahawks, Houston Texans, Dallas Cowboys, and Washington Redskins.

Early years
He played high school football at Foster High School in Richmond Texas.

Professional career

Kansas Chiefs
Williams spent the 2009 preseason as a member of the Kansas City Chiefs before being released. Williams was promoted to the active roster on December 5, 2009 due to the season-ending knee injury suffered by Kolby Smith.

He was released on September 4, 2010.

Seattle Seahawks
Williams was signed to the practice squad of the Seattle Seahawks on October 6, 2010. He was released on October 10.

Houston Texans
On August 12, 2011, Williams signed with the Houston Texans. He was released on September 3. He signed with the team's practice squad on October 19. 

Williams was released on June 4, 2012.

Dallas Cowboys
On August 6, 2012, Williams signed with the Dallas Cowboys. He was released on August 27.

Washington Redskins
Williams signed with the practice squad of the Washington Redskins on September 11, 2012.

References

External links
 Tennessee State Tigers bio 
 Kansas City Chiefs bio 

1986 births
Living people
People from Richmond, Texas
Players of American football from Texas
American football running backs
Tennessee State Tigers football players
Kansas City Chiefs players
Seattle Seahawks players
Sportspeople from the Houston metropolitan area